Tell Abraq (Til Abrook) was an ancient Near Eastern city. Located on the border between Sharjah and Umm Al Quwain in the United Arab Emirates, the city was originally on the coastline of the Persian Gulf but changing sea levels have placed the remains of the city inland. It is located on the main road from Umm Al Quwain to Falaj Al Mualla.

The mound containing the ruins of Tell Abraq was originally excavated by a team from the University of Copenhagen working on the extensive remains of the city of Ed-Dur, a few kilometres to the north. Their original intention was to confirm the time sequence prior to Ed-Dur's primacy, around 1,000 BCE. However, they were surprised to find extensive indications of much earlier settlement, dating back to the Umm Al Nar period, including a 3rd millennium monumental fortification.

Tell Abraq has been cited as being the "best preserved and largest prehistoric settlement in the Lower Gulf"  and is thought to be one of the key locations of the area the Sumerians knew as 'Magan'.

History
Finds at Tell Abraq show human occupation through the Umm Al Nar, Wadi Suq and Iron Age periods, from approximately 2,500 BCE to 400 BCE. At the core of the settlement lies a large circular fortification built out of mud brick and faced with stone, some 40 meters in diameter and eight metres high. This has been preserved by an Iron Age mud platform, built over the fortification. It is the largest of the distinctive Umm Al Nar fortress towers to be excavated in the UAE. As well as a collection of Umm Al Nar buildings and fireplaces, mud brick buildings dating from the second and early first millennium were found.

The Umm Al Nar tomb contained the remains of some 286 individuals. Analysis of the human remains have shown evidence that individuals suffering illness and limited mobility were cared for, pointing to a developed society which was sufficiently secure and prosperous to be able to afford compassion. One of the individuals, a woman in her twenties, was found to be suffering from polio, thought to be the earliest dated instance of the disease in human history.

As with Ed-Dur, there is evidence of extensive trade links between the people of Tell Abraq and Mesopotamia, Iran and the Indus Valley. Finds include two Harappan cubical weights, distinctive Harappan carnelian and agate jewellery and tin and ivory from Afghanistan. An ivory comb found at the site has been linked through its decorative form to Bactria. There is evidence that bronze was both refined and cast at the site.

Some 600 sherds of red-ridged Barbar pottery at Tel Abraq show distinct links to Umm Al Nar island and also ancient 'Tilmun', or Bahrain.

Tell Abraq boasts the largest collection of faunal remains uncovered on any archaeological site within the Arabian Peninsula. Domesticated animals such as sheep, goats and cattle were reared, while locally available wild animals such as gazelle and oryx were hunted. Fish and shellfish as well as turtles and dugongs from the Persian Gulf were eaten extensively. Digs have uncovered over 100,000 animal bone remains.

Both Tell Abraq and Shimal and Seih Al Harf in Ras Al Khaimah show a continuation from the Umm Al Nar to Wadi Suq periods, although Shimal has yielded a preponderance of the distinctive Wadi Suq burials. The tower at Tell Abraq continued to be occupied throughout this period, with evidence of a changing lifestyle among its occupants and more dependence on seafood. Further possible links between these two communities (through Ed-Dur) is provided by Iron Age pottery finds at Tell Abraq, which include similar artefacts to those found at Shimal.

Archaeology
The mound comprises an area of some four hectares and rises to a height of some ten metres above the surrounding sabkha, or salt flats.it is a well known site in the UAE

The site was excavated in 5 seasons between 1989 and 1998 by a team from the University of Copenhagen in Denmark led by Daniel Potts. Work was resumed in 2007 by a joint team from the Bryn Mawr College and the University of Tübingen led by Peter Magee. Initially principally involved in cataloging the existing site, in 2010 large scale excavations were undertaken. A charcoal sample from the base area of the Umm Al Nar fortress tower provided a radiocarbon date of 2461–2199 BC (C14 date 3840±40 BP). It was calibrated with  IntCal13.

Finds from Tell Abraq have been crucial in the division of the Iron Age I (1200-1000 BC), II (1000-500 BC) and III (500-300 BC) periods in the UAE.

See also

List of Ancient Settlements in the UAE
Archaeology of the United Arab Emirates
Cities of the ancient Near East
 Barbar Temple

Notes

References
D. T. Potts and W. J. Reade, New evidence for late third millennium linen from Tell Abraq, Umm Al-Qaiwain, UAE, Paléorient, vol. 19, iss. 19-2, pp. 99–106, 1993
 C.H. Pedersen and V.F. Buchwald, An examination of metal objects from Tell Abraq, U.A.E., Arabian Archaeology and Epigraphy, vol.  2, no.1, pp. 1–9, 1991.
 Daniel T. Potts and R. Thomas, Atacamite Pigment at Tell Abraq in the Early Iron Age, Arabian Archaeology and Epigraphy, vol. 7, p. 13-16. 1996
 Daniel T. Potts and Margareta Tengberg, gismes.má-gan-na (Dalbergia sissoo Roxb.) at Tell Abraq, Arabian Archaeology and Epigraphy, vol. 10, pp. 129–133, 1999
Daniel T. Potts, Tepe Yahya, Tell Abraq and the Chronology of the Bampur Sequence, Iranica Antiqua, vol.38, pp. 1–24, 2003
 P. Grave, et al., Elemental characterisation of Barbar ceramics from Tell Abraq, Arabian Archaeology and Epigraphy, vol. 7, iss. 2, pp. 177–187, 1996
Lloyd Weeks, Lead isotope analyses from Tell Abraq, United Arab Emirates: new data regarding the'tin problem'in Western Asia, Antiquity, vol. 73, pp. 49–64, 1999
 Lloyd Weeks, Prehistoric Metallurgy at Tell Abraq, U.A.E., Arabian Archaeology and Epigraphy, vol. 8, iss. 1, pp. 11–85, 1997
Willcox, George, and Margareta Tengberg, "Preliminary report on the archaeobotanical investigations at Tell Abraq with special attention to chaff impressions in mud brick", Arabian Archaeology and Epigraphy 6.2, pp. 129-138, 1995
 Blau Soren, Attempting to Identity Activities in the Past: Preliminary Investigations of the Third Millennium BC Population at Tell Abraq, Arabian Archaeology and Epigraphy, vol. 7, pp. 143–176, 1996
Van de Velde, Thomas, et al. “The Bitumen Imports at Tell Abraq — Tracing the Second-Millennium BC Bitumen Industry in South-East Arabia.” Proceedings of the Seminar for Arabian Studies, vol. 47, 2017, pp. 227–37

External links

Sharjah Archaeology Museum
Abu Dhabi Islands Archaeological Survey

Archaeological sites in the United Arab Emirates
Abraq
Archaeology of the United Arab Emirates
History of the United Arab Emirates